José Abraham Cisneros Gómez (born 24 May 1969) is a Mexican politician from the National Action Party. From 2000 to 2003 he served as Deputy of the LVIII Legislature of the Mexican Congress representing Jalisco.

References

1969 births
Living people
Politicians from Jalisco
National Action Party (Mexico) politicians
21st-century Mexican politicians
Deputies of the LVIII Legislature of Mexico
Members of the Chamber of Deputies (Mexico) for Jalisco